Ali Seçkiner Alıcı (born 3 July 1965) is a Turkish musician and actor.

Life 
He was born on 3 July 1965, in Kars. In 1985 graduated from the Music Education Department of Gazi Üniversitesi. After 4 years of music education, he became a member of the Devlet Çoksesli Korosu that was established in 1988 as a bassist. He left it in 2017. Ali Seçkiner Alıcı at the same time in Ankara was participating working in plays, as a music director and education consultant. Beside the films and tv shows that he was a part of precedingly, he was a leading role in Mahmut Fazıl Coşkuns 75. Venedik Film Festivali participating film "Anons" and Çağıl Bocut's first feature film "Sardunya". At the same time he had important roles in populer projects such as "Bergen", "Beni Çok Sev", "Yargı", "Bizim için Şampiyon". His latest event was the 75th Cannes Film Festival's "Un Certain Regard" sections International premier of Emin Alper's latest film "Kurak Günler".

Other 
Alıcı was among the top searched people in 2022 with over 9-thousand news sources about him that year.

Filmography

Musicianship 

 Erzurum Çarşı Pazar
 Bozlak
 Abaro
 Turnalar Semahı
 Sabahın Seherinde
 Yemen
 Ankara'da Yedim Taze Meyveyi
 Kiziroğlu
 Zahid
 Yemen
 Oğul Eminem
 Çanakkale

Sources

External links 

 
 Ali Seçkiner Alıcı at SinemaTürk
 Ali Seçkiner Alıcı at Sinemalar.com
 Ali Seçkiner Alıcı at Beyazperde
 Ali Seçkiner Alıcı at Tiyatrolar.com.tr
 

Turkish male stage actors
Turkish male film actors
Turkish male television actors
1975 births
Living people
Turkish male musicians